David Ernest Malloy is an American country music and pop songwriter, record producer and A&R executive with 41 number one hits. He had received multiple Grammy nominations, as writer and/or producer, and has worked with many artists and projects including USA for Africa, Tim McGraw, Dancing with the Stars Julianne Hough, Eddie Rabbitt, Dolly Parton, Reba McEntire, Kenny Rogers, Mindy McCready, Badfinger, and Tanya Tucker. Malloy received Grammy nominations for writing the songs "Driving My Life Away" and "One Voice". He received the BMI Burton Award for "Suspicions", a song he wrote with Rabbitt.

Early life

Music was a major part of Malloy's life from an early age. His father, Jim Malloy, is a Grammy Award-winning recording engineer. When Malloy was young, his father worked in recording studios around Los Angeles, but the family moved to Nashville when David was 13. Malloy took his first guitar lesson at 15 and immediately knew that he wanted to write and produce music for a living.

Music career
Malloy's first major success as a songwriter/producer came in a collaborative effort with country music artists and songwriters Eddie Rabbitt and Even Stevens.  Together they produced 16 number one hits.  The success Malloy experienced with Rabbitt laid the groundwork for production and songwriting work with artists like Kenny Rogers, Dolly Parton, Tanya Tucker, Badfinger and Billy Burnette in the 1980s.

Recent work
Malloy worked in the A&R department of Columbia/Epic Records and then ran the Nashville division of Elektra Records, and was a producer at Elektra in Los Angeles. Malloy produced the Mercury Records debut of Dancing with the Stars' Julianne Hough. The CD entered the country charts at number 1 and at number 3 on the overall Hot 100 chart. He also enjoyed chart success with Tim McGraw's version of "Suspicions" (written with Rabbitt). Other recent projects include co-producing a beach-themed concept album, Edge of the Blue, with songwriter/producer Tim Johnson.

Teen Hoot and Nashville Hootenanny
Malloy is the creator of the new artist online platform Teen Hoot. The Nashville Hootenanny and a similar group for younger artists called Teen Hoot, are social media communities that offer quarterly world-wide streaming video broadcasts of young musicians. Teen Hoot videos are viewed over 50,000 times a month in over 150 countries. Artists who have appeared on the shows have gone on to perform on the Disney Channel, American Idol, America's Got Talent, The X-Factor USA, The Voice US and The Voice UK.

References

External links
 Teen Hoot

Year of birth missing (living people)
American country songwriters
American male songwriters
Record producers from Tennessee
Songwriters from Tennessee
People from Nashville, Tennessee
Living people